Christopher Colin Brunt (born 14 December 1984) is a Northern Irish former professional footballer who played as a midfielder and is the current West Bromwich Albion loan player manager. He is widely regarded as one of the greatest midfielders in the club’s history.

A versatile player, Brunt featured primarily as a left winger, but could also operate as a left back or attacking midfielder. Brunt started his career with Middlesbrough but did not manage to make an appearance for the first team. He joined Sheffield Wednesday in 2004 and amassed 153 appearances for the club before joining West Bromwich Albion in 2007, where he went on to feature in over 400 matches.

Brunt earned 65 caps for the Northern Ireland national team between 2004 and 2017. He also represented his country at youth level.

Early life
Brunt was born and raised in Belfast, Northern Ireland, where he attended Newtownbreda Primary School. He then went on to study at Wellington College Belfast. As a youth player, he appeared for Saint Andrew's Boys' Club.

Club career

Middlesbrough
Brunt had trials with professional teams Rangers and Middlesbrough as a 16-year-old. He joined Middlesbrough's academy in 2001 and signed his first professional contract a year later. However, he failed to break into the first team at the Teesside club.

Sheffield Wednesday

He moved to Sheffield Wednesday in March 2004 on an initial short-term deal. A permanent free transfer followed soon after as Brunt signed a two-year contract at Wednesday.

In the 2004–05 season, his first full season at the club, Brunt helped Wednesday achieve promotion to the Championship by scoring five goals in all competitions with four of those coming in the league. In July 2005, he agreed a one-year extension to his existing contract.

He went on to hit seven goals the following season, finishing the campaign as the club's top goalscorer. He also passed the 100 appearance mark for Wednesday during the 2005–06 season, making him the club's most experienced player at the time.

With only one year remaining on his contract, negotiations between Brunt and Wednesday broke down in July 2007, due to what the club described as 'excessive wage demands'.

West Bromwich Albion

2007–2010: Securing top-flight status
West Bromwich Albion's bid for Brunt was accepted on 14 August 2007. They completed the signing the next day, in a £3 million four-year deal, which included £500,000 of performance-related add-ons. Brunt made his Albion debut as a second-half substitute in a 2–0 home win over Barnsley on 1 September 2007. He scored his first goal for the club in a 3–2 victory away at Scunthorpe United on 22 September 2007.

Brunt's performance in the 3–0 home win against Plymouth Argyle on 1 March 2008 saw him named in the Championship Team of the Week. On 28 April 2008, Brunt scored a late equalising goal against Southampton in a 1–1 draw; this effectively secured Albion's promotion to the Premier League because of their superior goal difference. He went on to score the free kick in West Brom's 2–0 win over Queens Park Rangers (QPR) that sealed automatic promotion.

Brunt was the club's top scorer in the 2008–09 season, scoring nine goals. This season ended in disappointment for Brunt and his West Brom teammates as the club were relegated, finishing in last place. He was named the club's Player of the Year for the 2008–09 season.

He enjoyed the most prolific goalscoring campaign of his career to date in the 2009–10 season with 13 goals in 43 games in all competitions. The Northern Ireland native once again helped the club reach the highest tier of English football, scoring the second goal in a 3–2 away win over Doncaster on 10 April 2010, which sealed the club's Premier League status. Brunt signed a new three-year contract in July 2010 to keep him at the club until the summer of 2013.

2011–2014: Club captain
In January 2011, Brunt was made stand-in captain as the manager decided to drop previous club captain Scott Carson. When Roy Hodgson took charge of the Baggies in February 2011, he made Brunt the permanent captain of the club. He signed another three-year contract in August 2011 as a reward for his impressive form.

He continued to be club captain after a new head coach was appointed when Hodgson had left to manage the England national team.

Brunt helped the team secure an 8th-place finish in the 2012–13 season, the highest the club has finished in the Premier League era, while also helping to secure the record number of points for the club (48). He scored twice in the season, his first a 30-yard strike at QPR which Albion won 2–1 and the second a finish from the edge of the box in a 2–2 draw at home to Aston Villa.

Alan Irvine confirmed Brunt would remain as club captain when he was appointed West Brom manager in the summer of 2014. He signed a new three-year deal on 10 August 2014 to keep him at the club until the summer of 2017.

2015–2020: Injury and comeback

Brunt relinquished the captaincy to new signing Darren Fletcher when the former Manchester United player made his debut for West Brom on 8 February 2015 in a match against Burnley. On 18 May 2015, Brunt was hit in the head by a ball kicked by Cesc Fàbregas in a match against Chelsea which resulted in the sending off of the latter.

He was struck on the face by a coin thrown by a West Brom supporter on 20 February 2016 in an FA Cup Fifth Round tie at Championship side Reading. Brunt was appalled by the incident, stating: "If people come to football matches and think it is acceptable to throw coins at footballers or anyone else, it is disgusting."

Brunt returned to first-team action after eight months out with an anterior cruciate knee injury in the 1–1 draw against Tottenham Hotspur at The Hawthorns on 15 October 2016. He scored his first goal of the 2016–17 season on 3 December in a 3–1 home win over Watford, ending a run of 29 Premier League appearances without a goal. His second goal of the season came on 2 January 2017 in a 3–1 home victory against Hull City, when he headed in from a Matt Phillips corner kick. 12 days later, he made his 300th league appearance and 200th Premier League start for West Brom in the next fixture against Tottenham Hotspur at White Hart Lane which ended in a 4–0 defeat for the West Midlands club. On 9 February 2017, Brunt signed a contract extension which would keep him at the club until the summer of 2018 with an option for another year should he trigger a clause relating to appearances. He made his 500th career appearance in club football against Burnley in August 2017 and the following month made his 350th appearance for Albion, against Watford.

In his final game for West Brom, Brunt helped them seal promotion to the Premier League with a 2–2 draw against Queens Park Rangers. He was released from West Bromwich Albion in the 2020 summer transfer window after spending 13 years with the club. Brunt holds Albion's Premier League appearance record, having turned out 269 times for the club in the competition.

Bristol City
Following his departure from The Baggies, on 7 September 2020, Brunt signed for Championship side Bristol City on a one-year deal.

On 3 January 2021, Brunt departed Bristol City, after it was mutually agreed to end his contract following an injury which will rule him out for most of the remaining season.

In May 2021, he announced his retirement from professional football.

International career
Brunt made 65 appearances for the Northern Ireland national team. He scored his first goal for his country in February 2009, when his free kick helped Northern Ireland to a 3–0 away victory over San Marino. In April 2012, it was revealed that Brunt was in manager Stuart Pearce's provisional squad for the 2012 Olympic Great Britain football team. He was in the end not selected in the final 18-man squad for the Games.

He missed out on the chance to appear at Euro 2016 after damaging his anterior cruciate ligament which required surgery. On 11 November 2016, Brunt returned to the international scene for Northern Ireland's 2018 World Cup qualification match against Azerbaijan. After sustaining a head injury early on, he recovered to set up a goal for club teammate Gareth McAuley and scored the final goal of a 4–0 win.

He announced his retirement from international football in August 2018.

Coaching career
In March 2021, Brunt returned to West Bromwich Albion as an academy coach. The following year, he was appointed as the club's loans manager.

Personal life
Brunt became a father for the first time on 1 May 2008, when his wife Cathy gave birth to a baby boy named Charlie. The couple then welcomed a second child, Zach David Brunt, on 18 April 2011. Brunt is a cousin of Canadian ice hockey player Shawn Thornton.

Career statistics

Club

International

Northern Ireland score listed first, score column indicates score after each Brunt goal.

Honours
Sheffield Wednesday
Football League One play-offs: 2005

West Bromwich Albion
Football League Championship: 2007–08; runner-up: 2009–10, 2019–20

Individual
West Bromwich Albion Player of the Year: 2008–09

References

External links

Profile  at the West Bromwich Albion F.C. website
Profile at the Irish Football Association website

1984 births
Living people
People educated at Wellington College Belfast
Association footballers from Belfast
Association footballers from Northern Ireland
Northern Ireland youth international footballers
Northern Ireland under-21 international footballers
Northern Ireland international footballers
Association football wingers
Association football midfielders
Association football fullbacks
Middlesbrough F.C. players
Sheffield Wednesday F.C. players
West Bromwich Albion F.C. players
Bristol City F.C. players
English Football League players
Premier League players